Maksim "Max" Sergeyevich Snegirev (born 12 June 1987) is a Russian racing driver. He currently resides in London.

Career

Formula Palmer Audi
Unlike most racing drivers, Snegirev had no karting experience and made his racing debut in Formula Palmer Audi in 2007. He finished nineteenth with fourteen point-scoring finishes and six retirements. Snegirev remained in the series for 2008, improving to eleventh place in the championship and was running at the finish of each race. His best result was sixth place at Donington.

In 2009 Snegirev returned to the series, participating in the final round at Snetterton, scoring five points in his only race, failing to start in another two races. Snegirev made another return to the series in 2010, contesting the last two weekends of the season at Croft and Silverstone. He won a race at Croft and took two podiums at Silverstone.

Formula Renault
Snegirev took part in the Rockingham races of the 2008 Formula Renault 2.0 UK Winter Cup with Falcon Motorsport. He also competed in two races of the main series in 2009 with Tempus Sport.

Formula Three
Snegirev made his debut in the National Class of the British Formula 3 Championship in 2009 with Team West-Tec. In a slim field, he finished fourth in the championship despite missing two rounds at Hockenheim and Spa.

He remained in the series in 2010, but switched to the Championship Class and Fortec Motorsport. Despite his Formula Two involvement Snegirev returned to the series in 2011, competing at Brands Hatch, Donington Park and Silverstone.

Formula Two
In 2011, Snegirev made his Formula Two debut. He had three point-scoring finishes in sixteen races, and finished eighteenth in the championship. After missing the first round of the 2012 season at Silverstone due to Auto GP commitments, he returned to the series for the remainder of the season.

Auto GP
Snegirev stepped up to the Auto GP World Series in 2012 joining Campos Racing.

Current career 
Snegirev has worked as a recruitment consultant in the Automotive and Motorsport industry since 2015.

Racing record

Career summary

Complete FIA Formula Two Championship results
(key) (Races in bold indicate pole position) (Races in italics indicate fastest lap)

Complete Auto GP results
(key) (Races in bold indicate pole position) (Races in italics indicate fastest lap)

References

External links

 

1987 births
Living people
Russian racing drivers
British Formula Three Championship drivers
British Formula Renault 2.0 drivers
Formula Palmer Audi drivers
FIA Formula Two Championship drivers
Auto GP drivers
Sportspeople from Moscow
Virtuosi Racing drivers
Campos Racing drivers
Hitech Grand Prix drivers
Fortec Motorsport drivers
Team West-Tec drivers